Reading West railway station serves West Reading, Berkshire, about  west from the town's main retail and commercial areas. The station is served by local services operated by Great Western Railway.

History

On 1 November 1848, Berks and Hants Railway's second route to  opened. The two lines merged at Southcote Junction, just south of the eventual station site, running together through that site to Reading station.

Reading West station itself did not open until 1 July 1906, by which time the Berks and Hants Railway had been subsumed into the Great Western Railway. The station was originally intended to serve trains between the north of England and the south coast which could thus avoid a reversal at Reading.

In 2021, work began on a new station building on Oxford Road, as well as a new entrance from Tilehurst Road, and a new bus interchange.

Accidents and incidents 
On 28 December 1965, the 08:30 passenger service from Reading General to  derailed near the station. The 10-coach train was travelling at  when it struck a broken rail, derailing at the fifth carriage (with the wheels of the following coaches also derailing). An investigation found that the rail had suffered a transverse fracture at the site of wheelburns. None of the passengers sustained serious injury.

Location 
To the north of the station the line crosses a railway bridge over the Oxford Road, followed by Oxford Road Junction, which is the southern apex of a triangle of tracks. The tracks to the west curve round to join the Great Western Main Line towards Bristol at Reading West Junction, and are largely used by freight trains between Southampton Docks and points to the north. The tracks to the east lead to Reading station and are mostly used by passenger services.

To the south of the station the line enters a cutting, crossed by high level bridges carrying the Tilehurst Road and, further to the south, the Bath Road. Beyond the cutting is Southcote Junction, where the line to  diverges from that to Newbury. Until 1983 there was a third line at the junction, the Coley branch line, which diverted just to the north at Coley Branch Junction and served Reading Central goods station. In 2015, Network Rail’s Western Route Study suggested the provision of a grade separated junction at Southcote, with a third track to be provided between there and the Oxford Road Junction at Reading West.

There is separate pedestrian access to the northern end of both platforms from Oxford Road, together with access to the southern end of the down platform from Tilehurst Road.

Services
The station is served by local services operated by Great Western Railway between Reading and Basingstoke or Newbury. During weekday daytime the station is served by two trains an hour on the Basingstoke route, plus one on the Newbury route. Trains are less frequent on Sundays and in the evenings. Trains take some 3 minutes to reach Reading, 20 minutes to reach Basingstoke, 25 minutes to reach Newbury and just over 30 minutes to reach London.

South West Trains previously ran services from Reading to Basingstoke, which occasionally ran to Brighton.

References

External links 

Railway stations in Berkshire
DfT Category E stations
Buildings and structures in Reading, Berkshire
Transport in Reading, Berkshire
Railway stations in Great Britain opened in 1906
Former Great Western Railway stations
Railway stations served by Great Western Railway